Hilgay Heronry is a  biological Site of Special Scientific Interest  south of Downham Market in  Norfolk.

This small wood has a nationally important breeding colony of grey herons, with around forty nests each year in larch and ash trees. Nearby drainage dykes on The Fens provide feeding grounds.

The site is private land with no public access.

References

Sites of Special Scientific Interest in Norfolk